Passirano is a comune in the province of Brescia, in Lombardy, Italy. Passirano is located 15 km northwest of Brescia, in the historical region of Franciacorta.

References